Carex thibetica is a tussock-forming species of perennial sedge in the family Cyperaceae. It is native to parts of  China and Vietnam.

See also
List of Carex species

References

thibetica
Taxa named by Adrien René Franchet
Plants described in 1888
Flora of China
Flora of Vietnam